The 2011–12 Championnat de France amateur 2 season was the 14th since its establishment. Chambéry were the defending champions. The teams and groups were announced on 18 July 2011 and the fixtures were determined on 28 July. The season began on 20 August 2011 and ended on 2 June 2012. The winter break was in effect from 23 December to 6 January.

Teams 

There were 34 promoted teams from the Division d'Honneur, replacing the 32 teams that were relegated from the Championnat de France amateur 2 following the 2010–11 season. A total of 72 teams competed in the league with 32 clubs suffering relegation to the sixth division, the Division d'Honneur. All non-reserve clubs that secured league status for the season were subject to approval by the DNCG before becoming eligible to participate in the competition.

Promotion and relegation 

Teams relegated to Championnat de France amateur 2
 Aurillac
 Genêts Anglet
 Louhans-Cuiseaux
 Noisy-le-Sec
 Saint-Pryvé Saint-Hilaire
 Rennes B

Teams promoted to Championnat de France amateur 2
 Ajaccio B
 Amiens B
 Aubagne
 Belfort Sud
 Boulogne B
 Chaumont
 Échirolles
 Eu
 Evian B
 Flers
 Fleury-Mérogis
 Fresnoy-le-Grand
 Iris Club
 La Suze
 Le Poiré-sur-Vie B
 Les Herbiers B
 Limoges
 Mâcon
 Marmande
 Marseille B
 Muret
 Narbonne
 Neuves-Maisons
 Saint-Colomban Locminé
 Saint-Georges-les-Ancizes
 Saint-Jean-le-Blanc
 Sézanne
 Steinseltz
 Thaon
 Thouars
 Trouville-Deauville
 Vannes B

DNCG rulings 

On 26 May 2011, following a preliminary review of each club's administrative and financial accounts in the Championnat National, the DNCG ruled that Grenoble would be relegated to the Championnat de France amateur (CFA) after the organization determined that the club was enduring financial difficulties. The organization also excluded relegated Championnat de France amateur club Toulon from participating in the CFA 2 and relegated both Agde and Chambéry to the fifth division. Chambéry had finished as the champions of the 2010–11 edition of the CFA 2. On 4 June, the DNCG announced that, for the second consecutive season, Calais would not be allowed to ascend to the CFA, which meant the club would be returning to the fifth division. All clubs had the option to appeal the rulings.

On 22 June, L'Entente SSG was relegated to the fifth division after the club declared bankruptcy. On 4 July, Grenoble confirmed on its website that the Appeals Board of the DNCG had informed club officials that it will be relegated to the fourth division.  Grenoble, subsequently, entered liquidation on 7 July, which made the club unable to participate in the CFA. The club was eventually inserted into the CFA 2. On the same day as the Grenoble ruling, the DNCG also rejected the appeals of Toulon and Calais. Division d'Honneur club Sézanne took up Toulon's position in the CFA 2. On 24 August, the Executive Committee of the French Football Federation announced that RC Strasbourg would be relegated to the CFA 2 after a Strasbourg tribunal ordered the club to enter liquidation. Strasbourg will, subsequently, replaced its reserve team in the division as they cannot appear in the same division as its parent club.

League tables

Group A

Group B

Group C

Group D

Group E

Group F

Group G

Group H

References

External links 
 CFA 2 Official Page
 CFA 2 Standings and Statistics 

 

5
Fra
2011